Longchang is a county-level city of Sichuan Province, China. It is under the administration of Neijiang city. Longchang has a population of nearly 760,000, covering 792 square kilometer.

Longchang seizes an important geographic location as the boundary of Sichuan and Chongqing, and plays as distributing center of Sichuan, Yunnan, Guizhou, Chongqing. Since the advantageous location, many important traffic ways pass through Longchang, like the Chengdu–Chongqing Railway, highway, public road, East Chuanyun (Sichuan to Yunnan) road, Longna (Longchang to Luzhou) highway, Longya (Longchang to Ya'an) road, Longhuang (Longchang to Huangtong Guizhou) railway. To get out of Sichuan Province and further go to the sea, you could choose Longchang as the best way. Thus it is called the east gate of Sichuan.

In the long history, Longchang is famous for memorial arches and blue stone. Longchang is a feature to develop tourism. Nowadays, Longchang has finished the plan of bluestone cultural city with eight bluestone image views, including gate, culture, city's dining room, lounge, green park, landscape, business district, landmark. Still this county has some other tourism resources, like groups of memorial arches, Guyu artificial lake, Yunding stockaded village, and Lamp Mountain.

Climate

References

County-level cities in Sichuan
Neijiang